Adrian Puente is a common surname in the Spanish language meaning "bridge".  It is uncommon as a given name.  People with the surname include:

Anahí Puente (born 1983), Mexican actress and singer
Audrey Puente (born 1970), American meteorologist
Brian de la Puente (born 1985), American NFL football player
David Puente, television journalist
Dorothea Puente (1929–2011), American serial killer
Isaac Puente (1896–1936), Basque physician
Luis de la Puente (1554–1624), Spanish Jesuit and spiritual author
Martina de la Puente (born 1975), Spanish shot putter
Miguel Puente (born 1948), Mexican baseball player
Rafael Puente, Mexican footballer
Tito Puente (1943–2000), Puerto Rican musician